"" is Mai Kuraki's 7th single, released on February 7, 2001. "Start in My Life" was used as the 11th ending theme to the Case Closed anime series.

Track listing

Charts

Weekly charts

Monthly charts

Year-end charts

Certification and sales

References

External links
Mai Kuraki Official Website

2001 singles
2001 songs
Mai Kuraki songs
Giza Studio singles
Case Closed songs
Songs written by Aika Ohno
Songs with lyrics by Mai Kuraki
Song recordings produced by Daiko Nagato